The Pine Bluff Weekly Herald was a newspaper in Pine Bluff, Arkansas. It debuted in 1900 and served the African American community. It was edited by J. C. Duke. S. W. Dawson was an associate editor.

References

Newspapers published in Arkansas
African-American newspapers
1900 establishments in Arkansas
Pine Bluff, Arkansas